Colin Stuart Montgomerie, OBE (born 23 June 1963) is a Scottish professional golfer. He has won a record eight European Tour Order of Merit titles, including a streak of seven consecutively from 1993 to 1999. He has won 31 European Tour events, the most of any British player, placing him fourth on the all-time list of golfers with most European Tour victories.

Montgomerie won three consecutive Volvo PGA Championships at Wentworth Club between 1998 and 2000. He has finished runner-up on five occasions in major championships and his career-high world ranking is second. He was inducted into the World Golf Hall of Fame in 2013.

In June 2013, after turning 50, Montgomerie joined the Champions Tour, where he made his debut in the Constellation Senior Players Championship, one of the five senior major championships. On 25 May 2014, Montgomerie won his first senior major championship at the Senior PGA Championship. He followed this up on 13 July 2014, when he claimed his second senior major at the U.S. Senior Open. On 24 May 2015, Montgomerie defended his Senior PGA Championship title to win his third senior major. However, in 2016 he narrowly missed out on making it three Senior PGA Championships in a row – finishing second and three shots behind winner Rocco Mediate. He won twice on the senior circuit in 2017, winning the inaugural Japan Airlines Championship before claiming his sixth Champions Tour win at the SAS Championship.

Early life
Although Scottish by birth and ancestry, he was raised in Yorkshire, England, where his father, James Montgomerie, was Managing Director of Fox's Biscuits. He spent a number of years with the Ilkley Golf Club, where he was tutored by the past professional Bill Ferguson. He was educated at both Leeds Grammar School and Strathallan School, Perthshire. During his time in Leeds, he became a supporter of Leeds United. His father later became the secretary of Royal Troon Golf Club, one of Scotland's most famous clubs.

Amateur career
Montgomerie became one of the first British golfers to go to a United States college, attending Houston Baptist University, where he played on the golf team and became its top player.

He won three important Scottish amateur tournaments – the 1983 Scottish Youths Championship, the 1985 Scottish Stroke Play Championship, and the 1987 Scottish Amateur Championship.

He played for Great Britain and Ireland twice in the Eisenhower Trophy (1984 and 1986) and twice in the Walker Cup (1985 and 1987). He was also part of the Scottish team, winning the 1985 European Amateur Team Championship at Halmstad Golf Club, North Course, in Sweden.

Before turning pro he considered a career in sports management, utilizing his degree in business management and law; the interview process included a golf outing that convinced the firm he should become a client rather than an employee.

Professional career
Montgomerie turned professional before the 1988 season and was named the Rookie of the Year on the European Tour that year. He quickly developed into one of Europe's top pros, winning his first event at the 1989 Portuguese Open TPC by 11 shots, and his second, beating a world class field, at the 1991 Scandinavian Masters at Royal Drottningholm Golf Club in Sweden. He made his Ryder Cup debut later in 1991.

He finished first on the European Tour Order of Merit every year from 1993 to 1999 (a record for most consecutive Orders of Merit), and has 31 victories on the tour, including the 1998, 1999, and 2000 Volvo PGA Championships at Wentworth, England.  However, despite many near-misses, Montgomerie was unable to win on the PGA Tour.

Montgomerie first reached the top-10 in the Official World Golf Rankings in 1994, and spent 400 weeks in the top-10. His highest ranking was number two. In his prime Montgomerie was considered one of the best drivers of the golf ball in the world and became a very precise iron player, often able to judge the distance he hit the ball exactly from long range.

Montgomerie came first in the Volvo Bonus Pool every year from 1993 to 1998. The Volvo Bonus Pool was an extra tranche of prize money awarded at the end of each European Tour season from 1988 to 1998 to the regular members of the tour who had had the best performances over the season.

His form fell away gradually in the new millennium, partly due to marriage problems, and his ranking slumped to 82nd in the world, but he came back strongly in 2005, winning a record eighth European Tour Order of Merit and returning to the top ten in the World Rankings. Late in 2005 he became the first man to win 20 million Euros on the European Tour—topping the European Tour's all-time highest earners list. He won for the first time in nearly two years at the Smurfit Kappa European Open in July 2007. In 2008, Montgomerie slipped out of the top 100 players in the world ranking system. A runner-up finish at the 2008 French Open in June boosted him back up the rankings, but his good play was short-lived, and as a result Montgomerie failed to qualify for Nick Faldo's 2008 Ryder Cup team. In March 2009, Montgomerie played in his milestone 500th European Tour event at the Open de Andalucia where he made the cut, but was not in contention during the weekend. He remained the leader in career earnings on the European Tour until 2010, when he was surpassed by Ernie Els.

After nearly two years without a top-10 finish, Montgomerie posted a final round of 68 for a share of 7th place in the 2011 BMW PGA Championship at Wentworth. Despite the drop in form, his influence remained strong. In 2012, Montgomerie was named by the Golf Club Managers' Association's Golf Club Management magazine as the seventh most powerful person in British golf. In August 2012, Montgomerie finished tied for 6th at the Johnnie Walker Championship at Gleneagles, his highest finish in over four years.

Form at major championships
Montgomerie is generally considered to be one of the best golfers never to have won a major championship, after finishing in second place on five separate occasions. During what most consider to be his best years in the 1990s Montgomerie had several close shaves. A third place at the 1992 U.S. Open at Pebble Beach Golf Links was the first of these. He was prematurely congratulated by Jack Nicklaus who said "Congratulations on your first U.S. Open victory" to Montgomerie after he finished the 18th hole on Sunday. Tom Kite, who was still on the golf course when Montgomerie finished, wound up winning the championship.

At the 1994 U.S. Open, played at Oakmont Country Club, Montgomerie lost in a three-man playoff to Ernie Els (a playoff which also included Loren Roberts). Montgomerie shot 78 to trail the 74s shot by Els and Roberts, with Els winning at the 20th extra hole.

At the 1995 PGA Championship, Montgomerie birdied the final three holes of the Riviera Country Club course in the final round, to tie Steve Elkington at 17 under par, which was a record low score in a major championship. On the first sudden-death playoff hole, after being in better position after two shots, Montgomerie missed his putt, while Elkington holed from 35 feet to claim the title.

Els defeated Montgomerie at the 1997 U.S. Open, played at Congressional Country Club. Montgomerie opened the tournament with a 65 but shot a 76 in the second round. A bogey on the 71st hole dropped Montgomerie one shot behind Els, who parred the last to win.

At the 2006 U.S. Open, played on the West course of the Winged Foot Golf Club, Montgomerie had yet another chance to win his first major championship. He stood in the middle of the 18th fairway in the final round having sunk a 50-foot birdie putt on the 17th green, which put him in the joint lead with Phil Mickelson. While waiting in position on the 18th fairway for the group in front to finish, Montgomerie switched his club from a 6-iron to a 7-iron, assuming adrenaline would kick in. Once the wait was over, he hit the approach shot poorly, ending up short and right of the green, in thick rough. He pitched onto the green, and then three-putted from 30 feet to lose the tournament by one stroke. After the loss, Montgomerie said, "At my age I've got to think positively. I'm 43 next week, and it's nice I can come back to this tournament and do well again, and I look forward to coming back here again next year and trying another U.S. Open disaster." Geoff Ogilvy won the championship.

Montgomerie's best finish in the Masters Tournament came in 1998 when he finished tied for 8th.

At The Open Championship in 2001 at Royal Lytham & St Annes Golf Club, Montgomerie started brightly with an opening 65, and still remained ahead after 36 holes, but he fell away over the weekend. He was also in contention with two rounds to play at Muirfield in 2002 and Royal Troon Golf Club in 2004, but failed to capitalise and finished midway down the field. His best finish in the Championship came in 2005 at St Andrews, where he finished second to Tiger Woods, who beat him by five shots.

In 2016, Montgomerie came through Open Qualifying at Gailes Links to qualify for his home Open at Royal Troon. He had the honour of hitting the opening tee shot at the tournament and ended up making the cut.

Following Sergio García's victory at the 2017 Masters, Montgomerie (with 75 starts) trailed only Jay Haas (87) and Lee Westwood (76) as the player with the most starts without a major title.

Ryder Cup and other golf

Despite his disappointments in the majors, Montgomerie is heralded as one of the greatest Ryder Cup players of all time. To date he has been a member of the European team on eight occasions, and has never lost in a singles match. He holds a win-lose-draw record of 20–9–7, thus giving him a total points scored tally of 23.5, only 2 points behind the all-time record held by Sergio García. He has played pivotal roles in several of the matches. He halved the last hole with Scott Hoch to obtain the half-point that won Europe the cup in 1997, and sank the winning putt, in what is considered to be his finest hour in the 2004 staging of the event.

Montgomerie was not part of Nick Faldo's 2008 Ryder Cup team, with the wildcards going to Paul Casey and Ian Poulter. Montgomerie captained the Great Britain and Ireland team in the first four stagings of the Seve Trophy, losing in 2000 but winning in 2002, 2003, and 2005.

On 28 January 2009, it was announced that Montgomerie would be the captain the European team at the 2010 Ryder Cup at Celtic Manor. On 4 October 2010, Montgomerie led the European team to victory, 14 to 13. On the same day he also announced that he would be stepping down as captain of the European Team. In December 2010, he accepted the BBC Sports Personality Coach of the Year award as captain of the victorious Ryder Cup team.

Montgomerie has been the playing captain of the European team in the Royal Trophy, played against a team from Asia. Europe was successful on both those occasions. He has the distinction of being the only person to have been a victorious player and captain in the Ryder Cup, Seve Trophy and Royal Trophy – the three main team golf competitions open to players from Europe.

In 2011, Montgomerie was named president of the English junior golf charity, the Golf Foundation, and in 2012 the Scottish first minister, Alex Salmond, named him as an ambassador for the Scottish junior golf programme, clubgolf.

In March 2015, Montgomerie accepted the captaincy of London Scottish Golf Club in Wimbledon to mark that club's 150th anniversary.

Montgomerie was also a columnist for the Scottish golf magazine, Bunkered, between 2008 and 2010.

OBE
At the end of 2004, Montgomerie was named an Officer of the Order of the British Empire in the New Year's Honours. He represents the Turnberry resort in Scotland, where there is a Colin Montgomerie Golf Academy.

Personal life
Montgomerie met his first wife Eimear Wilson, from Troon, when he was a good amateur and she was a promotions assistant. She was a 17-year-old law student at Edinburgh University and a spectator at an amateur championship in Nairn, at which Montgomerie destroyed the field. The couple had three children (Olivia, Venetia, and Cameron), and lived in Oxshott, Surrey. In 2002, Eimear gave Montgomerie an ultimatum to choose between golf and marriage, resulting in Montgomerie spending 10 weeks alone before they agreed to try again.

In 2006, the couple finally broke up, with Eimear suing for divorce on grounds of unreasonable behaviour due to his obsession with golf, claiming it left her suffering from anxiety and depression. In 2006, the couple agreed to a clean break divorce settlement of £8 million, in return for Eimear giving up any claim on Colin's future earnings.

Since the divorce, he has had various relationships, including Spanish model Ines Sastre, and a divorced neighbour Jo Baldwin, whom he met on the school run. Their split, he suggested, caused his worst run in his professional career.

In 2007, Montgomerie announced his engagement to Scottish millionairess Gaynor Knowles. The couple wed on 19 April 2008 at Loch Lomond Golf Club. On 8 July 2010, Montgomerie was granted a super injunction by Mr Justice Eady, which came to light when he attended a press conference at the 2010 PGA Championship in Wisconsin. In March 2017, he and Knowles divorced.

Montgomerie supports Rangers F.C. and since 1970 Leeds United when he was living in the area.

Amateur wins
1985 Scottish Amateur Stroke Play Championship
1987 Scottish Amateur Championship

Professional wins (54)

European Tour wins (31)

*Langer and Montgomerie agreed to share the 2002 Volvo Masters Andalucía after failing light caused play to halt after two holes of a playoff.
1Co-sanctioned by the Asian Tour

European Tour playoff record (0–7–1)

Asian Tour wins (4)

1Co-sanctioned by the European Tour

Asian Tour playoff record (1–0)

PGA Tour of Australasia wins (1)

Other wins (7)

Other playoff record (2–1)

PGA Tour Champions wins (7)

PGA Tour Champions playoff record (3–0)

European Senior Tour wins (9)

European Senior Tour playoff record (2–0)

Playoff record
PGA Tour playoff record (0–2)

Results in major championships

CUT = missed the half-way cut
WD = withdrew
DQ = disqualified
"T" = tied

Summary

Most consecutive cuts made – 9 (1998 PGA – 2000 PGA)
Longest streak of top-10s – 2 (1994 U.S. Open – 1994 Open Championship)

Results in The Players Championship

CUT = missed the halfway cut
"T" indicates a tie for a place

Results in World Golf Championships

1Cancelled due to 9/11

WD = Withdrew
QF, R16, R32, R64 = Round in which player lost in match play
"T" = tied
NT = No Tournament

Senior major championships

Wins (3)

Results timeline
Results are not in chronological order before 2022.

 
WD = withdrew
CUT = missed the halfway cut
"T" indicates a tie for a place
NT = No tournament due to COVID-19 pandemic

Team appearances
Amateur
European Youths' Team Championship (representing Scotland): 1982 (winners), 1984
Eisenhower Trophy (representing Great Britain & Ireland): 1984, 1986
European Amateur Team Championship (representing Scotland): 1985 (winners), 1987
Walker Cup (representing Great Britain & Ireland): 1985, 1987
St Andrews Trophy (representing Great Britain & Ireland): 1986 (winners)

Professional
Alfred Dunhill Cup (representing Scotland): 1988, 1991, 1992, 1993, 1994, 1995 (winners), 1996, 1997, 1998, 2000
World Cup (representing Scotland): 1988, 1991, 1992, 1993, 1997 (individual winner), 1998, 1999, 2006, 2007 (winners), 2008
Four Tours World Championship (representing Europe): 1991 (winners)
Ryder Cup (representing Europe): 1991, 1993, 1995 (winners), 1997 (winners), 1999, 2002 (winners), 2004 (winners), 2006 (winners), 2010 (non-playing captain, winners)

Seve Trophy (representing Great Britain & Ireland): 2000 (playing captain), 2002 (playing captain, winners), 2003 (playing captain, winners), 2005 (playing captain, winners), 2007 (winners)
UBS Cup (representing the Rest of the World): 2003 (tie), 2004
Royal Trophy (representing Europe): 2010 (playing captain, winners), 2011 (playing captain, winners)

See also
List of golfers with most European Tour wins
List of golfers with most European Senior Tour wins

Notes and references

External links

Scottish male golfers
Houston Christian Huskies men's golfers
European Tour golfers
European Senior Tour golfers
PGA Tour Champions golfers
Winners of senior major golf championships
Ryder Cup competitors for Europe
World Golf Hall of Fame inductees
Officers of the Order of the British Empire
People educated at Leeds Grammar School
People educated at Strathallan School
Golfers from Glasgow
Sportspeople from Yorkshire
People from Oxshott
1963 births
Living people